Catholic catechism may refer to:

 Roman Catechism, 1566
The Catholic Catechism (Hardon), 1975
 Catechism of the Catholic Church and its derived works

See also 

 Catechism